Johan Norell (born 29 September 1981) is a retired Swedish football defender.

References

1981 births
Living people
Swedish footballers
IK Brage players
Enköpings SK players
Landskrona BoIS players
Association football defenders
Allsvenskan players